Hardwarehouse was a home improvement chain in Australia. The chain was an offshoot of BBC Hardware, which was owned by Burns Philp and then Howard Smith Limited, and had stores in Australia and New Zealand. It was established by BBC Hardware as a way to implement and develop the adopted hardware warehouse concept which was based on overseas chains B&Q and Home Depot. 

Before Hardwarehouse was absorbed into Bunnings Warehouse in 2001, it was the largest corporately owned home improvement retailer in Australia and New Zealand with 62 stores and over 5,000 employees, as it traded under the BBC Hardware name.

History 
The first store was opened in the Sydney suburb of Bankstown on 3 October 1992. Despite the store having a larger selling space than the ones that opened later, it proved that the introduction of this concept was successful. BBC Hardware continued market testing to further develop the concept and help it gain traction in the retail hardware market. Another store was opened at Rockdale in 1993, and two more at Thornleigh and Caringbah in 1994, to reflect the continuous market testing.

In July 1994, Howard Smith Limited bought BBC Hardware from Burns Philp and the chain was rebranded as Hardwarehouse. Subsequently, the chain expanded by opening new stores in Melbourne, Perth and Queensland. This followed with the chain's expansion into New Zealand. Since 1994, Hardwarehouse opened up to 14 stores a year. By 2001, the chain had 59 stores in Australia and 3 stores in New Zealand.

Locations 
There were a total of 62 Hardwarehouse stores that operated across Australia and New Zealand. In Australia, there was two stores in the Australian Capital Territory, 29 stores in New South Wales (NSW), 14 in Queensland, two in Tasmania, eight in Victoria and five in Western Australia.

In New Zealand, Hardwarehouse operated primarily in Auckland, with three stores across the region.

Australia 
ACT: Fyshwick, Phillip.

NSW: Artarmon, Ashfield, Bankstown, Bella Vista, Belrose, Blacktown, Bonnyrigg, Campbelltown, Caringbah, Coffs Harbour, Crossroads, Glendale, Kotara, Lidcombe, Lismore, Mascot, Minchinbury, North Parramatta, Penrith, Rockdale, Shellharbour, Tamworth, Thornleigh, Tuggerah, Tweed Heads, Wagga Wagga, West Gosford, Wallsend, Wollongong and Villawood.

Qld: Booval, Burleigh Heads, Cairns, Capalaba, Caboolture, Everton Park, Harbour Town, Maroochydore, Mt Gravatt, Oxley, Rockhampton, Toowoomba South, Townsville and Underwood.

Tas: Kings Meadows and Moonah.

Vic: Bayswater, Doveton, Maribyrnong, Moorabbin, Notting Hill, Nunawading, Thomastown and Wendouree.

WA: Cannington, Innaloo, Morley, O'Connor and Whitfords.

New Zealand 
Auckland: Burswood, Manukau and Rosedale.

Acquisition 

On 13 June 2001, Howard Smith Limited, owner of BBC Hardware and Hardwarehouse, was bought by Wesfarmers. The chain began its transition with the stores trading as Bunnings Warehouse in Australia and New Zealand by the end of 2001. During the transition period, 3 of the acquired Hardwarehouse stores in Australia were closed, as the rest of the stores were reformatted by late 2004.

A number of former Bunnings Warehouse stores that were converted Hardwarehouse stores were converted into retail bulky goods stores, or repurposed for other uses. A few other stores were demolished and rebuilt for larger Bunnings Warehouse stores.

References

Hardware stores
Defunct retail companies of Australia